Prunus oblonga is a species of Prunus native to Peru.

References 

Prunus